Cherry Grove-Shannon Township is one of twelve townships in Carroll County, Illinois, USA.  As of the 2020 census, its population was 1,539 and it contained 813 housing units.

Geography

Cities
 Shannon

Unincorporated towns
 Georgetown
 Kittredge
 Zier Cors
(This list is based on USGS data and may include former settlements.)

Cemeteries
The township contains these five cemeteries: Brethren, Cherry Grove Brethren, Saint Wendelin, Shell and Spring Valley.

Major highways
  Illinois Route 72
  Illinois Route 73

Airports and landing strips
 Block Airport
 Kenneth Moll Airport
 Swan Valley Farm Airport

Demographics
As of the 2020 census there were 1,539 people, 532 households, and 368 families residing in the township. The racial makeup of the township was 94.74% White, 0.58% African American, 0.13% Native American, 0.06% Asian, 0.00% Pacific Islander, 1.10% from other races, and 3.38% from two or more races. Hispanic or Latino of any race were 4.42% of the population.

There were 532 households, out of which 20.10% had children under the age of 18 living with them, 60.53% were married couples living together, 3.57% had a female householder with no spouse present, and 30.83% were non-families. 27.80% of all households were made up of individuals, and 19.00% had someone living alone who was 65 years of age or older. The average household size was 2.38 and the average family size was 2.89.

The township's age distribution consisted of 21.6% under the age of 18, 7.3% from 18 to 24, 13.1% from 25 to 44, 26.1% from 45 to 64, and 31.9% who were 65 years of age or older. The median age was 52.4 years. For every 100 females, there were 93.9 males. For every 100 females age 18 and over, there were 102.4 males.

The median income for a household in the township was $63,750, and the median income for a family was $80,714. Males had a median income of $51,000 versus $30,333 for females. The per capita income for the township was $34,258. About 2.7% of families and 5.2% of the population were below the poverty line, including 7.3% of those under age 18 and 3.7% of those age 65 or over.

School districts
 Eastland Community Unit School District 308
 Pearl City Community Unit School District 200

Political districts
 Illinois's 16th congressional district
 State House District 89
 State Senate District 45

Notable residents 
David Denny (1832-1903), pioneer of Seattle, Washington

References
 
 United States Census Bureau 2007 TIGER/Line Shapefiles
 United States National Atlas

External links
 City-Data.com
 Illinois State Archives
 Carroll County official site

Townships in Carroll County, Illinois
Townships in Illinois